VfL Bad Berleburg is a German association football club from the city of Bad Berleburg, North Rhine-Westphalia.

History
The club was established 1 May 1921 as Spiel- und Sportverein Bad Berleburg. Following World War II organizations throughout the country, including sports and football clubs, were dissolved by the occupying Allied authorities. Following the conflict in 1945 VfL was reorganized as Turn- und Sportverein Bad Berleburg. It was renamed Spiel- und Sportverein Bad Berleburg in 1947.

On 21 February 1970 SSV merged with Turnverein 1863 Bad Berleburg and Skiclub 1909 Bad Berleburg with the newly formed club reclaiming its historical identity as VfL. They went on to advance out of Bezirksliga play through the Landesliga Westfalen to the Verbandsliga Westfalen where they played two seasons in 1975–76 and 1977–78. The team fared poorly in both campaigns and were twice relegated after finishing 17th and 18th.

The club now plays in the tier eight Bezirksliga Westfalen after relegation from the Landesliga Westfalen in 2016.

Honours
 Landesliga Westfalen Gruppe 2
 Champions: 1975, 1977
 Bezirksliga Westfalen
 Champions: 1974, 2014

References

External links
Official team site
Das deutsche Fußball-Archiv historical German domestic league tables 

Football clubs in Germany
Association football clubs established in 1863
1863 establishments in Prussia
Football clubs in North Rhine-Westphalia